Xenia Hausner (born 1951 in Vienna) is an Austrian painter and stage designer.

Life 
Hausner was born into a family of artists. Her father was the Austrian painter Rudolf Hausner.

From 1972 to 1976, she studied stage design at the Academy of Arts in Vienna and at the Royal Academy of Dramatic Art in London. From 1977 to 1992, she designed sets for theatre, opera and film at the Burgtheater in Vienna, Salzburg Festival, Royal Opera House Covent Garden in London, Theâtre Royal de la Monnaie in Brussels etc., as well as a stage design for a new production of Richard Strauss's opera “Der Rosenkavalier” in 2020 staged by André Heller at the Staatsoper Unter den Linden, Berlin.
Since 1992, Hausner has been working exclusively as a painter. Her works have been shown at numerous galleries, art fairs and museums.
She lives and works in Berlin and Vienna.

Work

Stage sets 
Her first stage sets were collages built from material collected from condemned houses, junk yards and garbage dumps. She used this raw material to assemble a theatrical space that sprung to life in the clash between naturalistic clarity and abstract interpretation. Her favorite configuration was the oxymoron, a correlation of opposites, a concentrated unification of elements caught in centrifugal chaos.

Painting 
As of 1990, she began concentrating on painting. People are at the center of her focus. Her images are enigmatic, the situations she depicts ambiguous. Hausner's large-formatted works are societal descriptions, the situations purposely fragmentary, snapshots from daily life. In contrast to the classical portrait, the characters in her images play the roles of people other than themselves. They are cast like actors in a play. Her style is expressive and her palette brims over with strong colours, a fact that is apparent in the flesh tones of her protagonists. In addition to the dominance of female figures, fiction and invention are her central themes. The lie that evokes the truth is her specialty and is painted, preserved and composed in images. Hausner paints invented stories the viewer can identify with his or her own life. Staging is also the main component of her retrospective exhibition, “True Lies” at the Albertina Museum Vienna.
Hausner works on paper and mixed-media as well. She transforms large-formatted photos into paintings, incorporating various materials depending on the specific medium she is working in. In this way, painting and photography merge, are transported to the limits of current artistic awareness. Using a variety of techniques, she concentrates images and constructs a new reality. Producing special edition art works on hand-made paper has become a new field of experimentation for Hausner. These unique limited editions deal with subjects known from her paintings, but the images are reinvented through technique and the medium and evolve into an independent artistic form. While preparing for her exhibition, "Damage", at the Shanghai Art Museum in 2011, she became intensively interested in Asiatic, especially Chinese motifs and began incorporating them into her personal artistic DNA: clear evidence of the global networking in contemporary art.

Photography 

In addition to painting, photography is a major component in her work. Hausner interlaces the history and potential inherent in both these image media in a multi-faceted manner, implicitly bringing into her painting not only the principles of photography but consolidating elements of film as well. Hausner stages photos as a basis for painting. She produces and directs her photographic scenarios in her studio, using one or more characters. The choice of a cut, the sense of the fragmentary, the actual montage and the drastic staging of light according to color ultimately contributes to the intense individual atmospheric character of the image.

Projects 
Hausner is active in the "Women without Borders" movement and documents through her camera women, active in the struggle against terrorism. She is strongly interested in architectural projects, for example the mantling of the Ringturm in Vienna in 2011, or in designing church windows (Kilian Church in Heilbronn, St. Johannis Church in Gehrden, St. Johannes and St. Laurentius Cathedral in Merseburg).

Prizes, honors, fellowships and awards 
 2000 - Ernst Barlach Preis

Notable exhibitions 
A selection
 2021: "Xenia Hausner. True Lies",  Albertina Museum, Vienna
 2020: "Xenia Hausner – This will have been another happy day!", Palais Populaire, Berlin
 2020: "Schiele – Rainer – Kokoschka / Der Welt (m)eine Ordnung geben", Landesgalerie Niederösterreich, Krems
 2020: "A.E.I.O.U. – Österreichische Aspekte in der Sammlung Würth", Galleri Würth, Hagan, Norway
 2020: "Freunde. Hunde und Menschen", Bayrisches Nationalmuseum, Munich
 2020: 8th Moscow International Biennale of Contemporary Art, State Tretyakov Gallery
 2019: "Xenia Hausner", Forum Gallery New York
 2019: "Xenia Hausner. Behind The Scenes", Austrian Cultural Forum New York
 2019: "Body extended", Shepherd W&K Galleries, New York
 2019: "Juntos Aparte", Bienalsur – South America's Art Biennale, Cucuta Colombia
 2019: "Xenia Hausner – Displaced – Storie in Movimento" Palazzo Ducale di Mantova, Museo Archeologico Nazionale, Italy
 2019: "Warhol bis Richter", Albertina Contemporary Art, Wien
 2019: "The Still Life in Contemporary Art" Galleri Würth, Norway
 2019: "Blickwechsel: Neue Frauenbilder" Galerie von Braunbehrens, Stuttgart
 2019: "Frauen über Frauen" Galerie Deschler, Berlin
 2018: "Die Geste" Ludwiggalerie, Schloss Oberhausen, Deutschland
 2018: "Guernica – Ikone des Friedens" Hofburg Innsbruck
 2018: "Objects of Desire" Xenia Hausner & Dorothee Golz, Galerie 422, Gmunden, Österreich
 2018: "Mit Haut und Haar. Frisieren, Rasieren, Verschönern", Wien Museum
 2018: "Xenia Hausner – Shaky Times" Danubiana Meulensteen Art Museum Bratislava
 2018: "Black & White", Galerie Deschler, Berlin
 2017: "Monet to Picasso. The Batliner Collection", Permanent Collection, Albertina, Wien, Österrreich
 2017: "Seeing with our own eyes", Forum Gallery, New York, USA
 2017: "Glasstress", Palazzo Franchetti, Venice
 2017: "Xenia Hausner – Exiles" in Personal Structures: Crossing Borders, Palazzo Bembo, Venice
 2017: „Entfesselt. Malerinnen der Gegenwart“, Schloss Achberg, Germany
 2017: „Fleischeslust“, Galerie Deschler, Berlin
 2017: „Modern & Contemporary Art“, Forum Gallery, New York
 2017: „10 – Alive and Kicking“, Dominik Mersch Gallery, Sydney
 2017: „Menagerie. An Animal Show from the Würth Collection“, Forum Würth Rorschach, CH
 2016: “Frau im Bild – Female Portraits from the Würth Collection”, Gallery Würth, Oslo
 2016: “Rendezvous, Meisterwerke aus der Sammlung Essl”, Essl Museum, Klosterneuburg
 2015: "From Hockney to Holbein. The Würth Collection in Berlin", Martin-Gropius-Bau, Berlin
 2015: "Personal Structures: Crossing Borders", Palazzo Mora, Venice
 2015: "Soft Power", Leo Gallery, Shanghai
 2015: "Girl, Girls, Girls", Galerie Deschler, Berlin
 2015: Xenia Hausner "Some Hope", FO.KU.S, Innsbruck
 2014: Xenia Hausner "Look Left – Look Right", Today Art Museum, Beijing
 2014: Xenia Hausner "Look Left – Look Right", The Pao Galleries, Hong Kong Arts Center, Hong Kong
 2014: "Glanzlichter. Meisterwerke zeitgenössischer Glasmalerei im Naumburger Dom", Naumburg
 2014: "Die Andere Sicht", Essl Museum, Klosterneuburg
 2013: "Sie. Selbst. Nackt." Paula Modersohn-Becker Museum, Bremen
 2013: "Painting Water", Berlin Art Week, Galerie Deschler
 2013: "A.E.I.O.U. – Österreichische Aspekte in der Sammlung Würth", Museum Würth, Künzelsau
 2012: "ÜberLeben" Sammlung Essl, Klosterneuburg
 2012: 5th Beijing International Art Biennial, Beijing (China)
 2012: "Xenia Hausner – Flagrant délit", Musée Würth France, Erstein
 2012: "Glasmalerei des 21. Jahrhunderts", Centre intern. du Vitrail, Chartres
 2011: "Damage", Shanghai Art Museum, Shanghai
 2011: "Sense of Family", Installation Ringturm, Vienna
 2011: "Glasmalerei der Moderne", Badisches Landesmuseum, Karlsruhe
 2010: "Intimacy. Bathing in Art", Kunstmuseum Ahlen, Ahlen
 2010: "Trailblazer", Gabriele Münter Prize 2010, Martin-Gropius-Bau, Berlin
 2009: "Sehnsucht nach dem Abbild. Das Portrait im Wandel der Zeit", Kunsthalle Krems
 2009: "Yearning for an Image: the Portrait through the Ages", Kunsthalle Krems
 2008:  Montijo International Biennal ON EUROPE 2008, Portugal
 2008: "You and I", Forum Gallery, New York
 2007: "Back to the Figure", Kunsthaus, Vienna
 2007: "Two", Galerie von Braunbehrens, Munich
 2006: "Back to the Figure – Contemporary Painting", Kunsthalle der Hypokulturstiftung, Munich
 2006: "Austria: 1900 – 2000 Confrontations and Continuities", Sammlung Essl, Klosterneuburg
 2006: "Works on Paper", Forum Gallery, New York
 2006: "Glücksfall", KunstHausWien, Wien
 2005: "Physiognomy of the 2nd Republic", Austrian Galerie Belvedere, Vienna
 2005: "Round Leather Worlds", Martin-Gropius-Bau, Berlin
 2005: "Xenia Hausner – Glücksfall", Ludwig Museum, Koblenz
 2004: "Strange. Reports of a Far Nearness", Kunstfest Weimar "Pélerinages"
 2004: "Xenia Hausner – 2nd Nature", Charim Galerie, Vienna
 2004: "Upper Class – Working Girl", Galerie der Stadt Salzburg
 2003: "New Paintings", Forum Gallery, Los Angeles
 2003: "Xenia Hauser – Lady's Choice", Galerie Deschler, Berlin
 2002: "Xenia Hausner – Paintings", Galerie Kämpf, Basel
 2002: "Xenia Hausner – Paintings", Galerie Hohmann, Hamburg
 2001: "Xenia Hausner – New Works", Rupertinum, Museum der Moderne, Salzburg
 2001: "Xenia Hausner – New Works", Galerie Thomas, Munich
 2000: "Xenia Hausner – Heart Matters", Käthe-Kollwitz-Museum, and Russian State Museum, St. Petersburg
 2000: "Xenia Hausner – Paintings", Ernst Barlach Museum, Hamburg Wedel
 2000: "Heart Matters", Forum Gallery, New York
 1999: "Figuration", Rupertinum Salzburg, Museion Bozen und Ursula Blickle Stiftung, Kraichtal
 1998: "Reality and Dream", Berlin Galerie, Berlin
 1998: "Xenia Hausner – Paintings", Kunsthalle, Koblenz
 1998: "Xenia Hausner – Love Fragments", Jesuitenkirche Galerie in Aschaffenburg
 1997: "Xenia Hausner – Love Fragments", Kunsthalle Vienna und Museum der bildenden Künste, Leipzig
 1997: "Contemporary Art in Austria", Europäisches Währungsinstitut, Frankfurt am Main
 1996: "Die Kraft der Bilder", Martin-Gropius-Bau, Berlin
 1996: "The Power of Images", Martin-Gropius-Bau, Berlin
 1996: "Human Pictures", Galerie Thomas, Munich
 1996: "Masterpieces of Austrian ContemporaryArt", Galerie Heike Curtze, Salzburg

Film 
 Arte, Metropolis: Stories of Loneliness and Closeness – Visiting Xenia Hausner in her studio in Vienna, broadcast 26 January 2013 at 4:45 P.M. 
 3sat, Culture Time: Harald Wilde, Grand Dame of portrait painting – Xenia Hausner at the Essl-Museum in Kosterneuburg, 24 October 2012.1
 Arte, Metropolis: The artist Xenia Hausner, first broadcast, 11 October 2003.

Public collections 
 Essl Museum Klosterneuburg
 Albertina
 Batliner Foundation 
 Wien Museum
 European Central Bank
 Museum Angerlehner
 Museum Würth, Künzselsau und Würth Collection Oslo
 Droege Group, Düsseldorf
 The George Economou Collection
 First Art Foundation
 Hong Kong Arts Centre
 Today Art Museum, Peking
 Seven Bridges Foundation
 Shanghai Art Museum
 Seven Bridges Foundation, USA
 Steven Bennett Collection, San Antonio/USA
 Serendipity Arts Trust, New Delhi, India
 Sammlung Klewan
 Paul Allen Collection

Literature 
  Xenia Hausner: Look Left – Look Right. Brandstätter Verlag, 2014, 
 ÜberLeben. Brandstätter Verlag, Wien 2012. 
 Flagrant délit. Swiridoff Verlag 2012. 
 Damage. Hirmer Verlag 2011. 
 You and I. Prestel Verlag, München 2008. 
 Two. Galerie von Braunbehrens, München 2007. 
 GlücksFall. Prestel Verlag, München 2005. 
 Damenwahl- Berichte aus dem Labor, mit Beiträgen von André Heller, Elfriede Jelinek und Peter Weiermair, deutsch/englisch, Übersetzung von P. J. Blumenthal und Allison Brown, Wienand Verlag, Köln 2003. 
 Wieland Schmied (Hrsg.): Xenia Hausner. Kampfzone. 2. Auflage, Wienand Verlag, Köln 2003. 
 Heart Matters. New York 2003. 
 Kampfzone. Wienand Verlag, Köln 2000. 
 Figuration. Bozen 1999. 
 Liebesfragmente. Wienand Verlag, Köln 1997. 
 Xenia Hausner: Rätselraum Fremde Frau. Braus Verlag, Heidelberg 1990, 
 Global Art Affairs Foundation: "Personal Structures – Crossing Borders". European Cultural Centre, Venice 2015, 
 Die andere Sicht. Sammlerin und Künstlerin. Edition Sammlung Essl, 2014, 
 Elfriede Jelinek: Werk und Rezeption. Diskurse. Kontexte. Impulse. Publikationen des Elfriede Jelinek-Forschungszentrums. Pia Janke (Hg.) 2014, 2 Teilbände
 Sie. Selbst. Nackt. Paula Modersohn-Becker und andere Künstlerinnen im Selbstakt. Hatje Cantz Verlag, 2013, 
 Dieter Wellershoff: Was die Bilder erzählen. Ein Rundgang durch mein imaginäres Museum. Kiepenheuer & Witsch Verlag, 2013, 
 A.E.I.O.U. Österreichische Aspekte in der Sammlung Würth. Swirdoff Verlag, 2013, 
 Museum Angerlehner. Hirmer Verlag, Munich, 
 Holger Brülls: Zeitgenössische Glasmalerei in Deutschland. Centre International du Vitrail, Chartres 2012, 
 Burkhard Leismann und Martina Padberg (Hg.): Intimacy! Baden in der Kunst. Kunstmuseum Ahlen, 2010, 
 Hans-Peter Wipplinger: Sehnsucht nach dem Abbild. Das Portrait im Wandel der Zeit. Kunsthalle Krems, 2009, 
 Christiane Lange/Florian Matzner (Hg.): Zurück zur Figur. Malerei der Gegenwart, Prestel Verlag Munich, 2006
 Österreich: 1900 – 2000. Konfrontation und Kontinuitäten. Edition Sammlung Essl, 2005

References

External links
 
 

Living people
1951 births
Artists from Vienna
Alumni of RADA
20th-century Austrian painters
21st-century Austrian painters
Austrian scenic designers
Austrian contemporary artists